Ramón Ayala, pseudonym Ramón Gumercindo Cidade (Garupá, Misiones, March 10, 1937) is a singer, writer and Argentine poet.
His music and prose, is strongly identified with the culture of their home province.

Ayala decided to create its own musical style, which he called "Gualambao"; (which it is formed by two polka rhythms chained by a permanent syncopation, which gives a particular appearance). It is written in 12/8 (twelve eighths), meaning that each bar has 12 eighth notes spread out over 4 times.

Among his best known songs is "El Mensú"—whose lyrics speak of the mensú: the growers, laborers and farmworkers—was a success in Argentina and Latin America; that even their song was performed by the Argentine-Cuban revolutionary Che Guevara in 1962, during a tour of the singer by Cuba.

Throughout his career, Ayala made presentations in Spain, Sweden, France, Italy, Romania, Cyprus, Uganda, Kenya, Tanzania, Lebanon, Turkey, Kuwait, Iraq, the islands of the pearl in the Persian Gulf, Iran, Persepolis, Kurdistan, Bahrain and other Middle Eastern countries, performing concerts and exhibitions of paintings.

His nephew, Guillermo "Walas" Cidade, is the lead singer and songwriter of the band of skate punk, Massacre.

References

External links 

1937 births
Argentine singer-songwriters
Argentine musicians
Living people
Argentine male singer-songwriters